Nandurbar Assembly constituency is one of the 288 Vidhan Sabha constituencies of Maharashtra state in western India. This constituency is located in the Nandurbar district and it is reserved for the candidates belonging to the Scheduled tribes. It is currently held by Vijaykumar Gavit of the BJP, who is former State Minister for Medical Education and Horticulture.

It is part of the Nandurbar Lok Sabha constituency along with another five Vidhan Sabha segments, namely Akkalkuwa, Shahada and Navapur in the Nandurbar district and Sakri and Shirpur in the Dhule district.

Members of Legislative Assembly

Election results

Assembly elections 2014

Assembly elections 2019

See also
 Nandu (disambiguation)
 List of constituencies of the Maharashtra Legislative Assembly

References

Assembly constituencies of Maharashtra
Nandurbar district